Negotiation ethics is a legal term meaning "refraining from making fraudulent misrepresentations."

Description
A 2004 article in the Marquette Law Review indicated that negotiating ethics had developed from an individual merely knowing the minimal legal threshold of acceptable behavior, to individuals being more aware that interests can be best understood in a wide perspective of ethical behavioral over the long term.

This basis of negotiation introduces not only a moral argument, but also introduces a case for the utilitarianism movement. Respect lies deep within the foundation of this school of thought concerning ethical negotiation. The authors propose that the negotiator does the right thing, even interpreting more ambivalent ethical questions conservatively; not because of the attractiveness of potential short-or long-term payoffs, but simply because the other party deserves to be treated with respect and not instrumentalized as a means to one’s own better negotiation results.
 
For many professional negotiators, the idea of being ethical during a negotiation is a dangerous minefield leading through an impossible feat, not meant to be accomplished. Many of these negotiators feel that negotiation ethics create a weak negotiation because it “encourages parties to disclose information to each other and develop a  degree of trust,  in contrast to the adversarial posture of traditional positional bargaining.” This expression of trust is contrary to the hard-tactic negotiations displayed by so many in the business world today. The thought of mutual benefit is dissipated, while the greed for gain over another grows rampantly.

The moral minimum for negotiating ethics consists of interests of well-being, autonomy, political freedom, standard social roles, and focal interests.

Although the aggression and competition of gamesmanship may lead to short-term gains,  it has two major drawbacks in an interest-based environment.  The first issue with gamesmanship is that reputation counts,  so that any immediate benefit will be negated by the inefficiencies imposed by distrust and the opportunity costs of foregone future transactions.

When one displays unethical behavior in negotiation settings, painful consequences may possibly arise. According to research, done by Ma and Parks, those who choose to engage in unethical negotiations increase the likelihood for reputational risk.

Research has demonstrated that college students who described having an ethical role model were less likely to adopt questionable ethical behavior in negotiation situations. Bandura notes that "the standards acquired through modeling are affected by variations in the judgments displayed by the same model over time and by discrepancies between what models practice and what they preach.

References

External links
 Negotiation Ethics by William Freivogel
 Negotiation Ethics by Charles B. Craver

Negotiation